The Second Sirimavo Bandaranaike cabinet was the central government of Ceylon led by Prime Minister Sirimavo Bandaranaike between 1970 and 1977. It was formed in May 1970 after the parliamentary election and it ended in July 1977 after the opposition's victory in the parliamentary election. The second Sirimavo Bandaranaike cabinet saw Ceylon severing the last colonial ties with Britain as the country became a parliamentary republic in May 1972. The country was also renamed Sri Lanka.

By July 1970,  a Constitutional Assembly replaced the British-drafted constitution with one drafted by the Ceylonese. Policies were introduced requiring that permanent secretaries in the government ministries have expertise in their division. For example, those serving in the Ministry of Housing had to be trained engineers, and those serving in the Ministry of Health, medical practitioners. All government employees were allowed to join Workers Councils and at the local level, she established People's Committees to allow input from the population at large on government administration. The changes were intended to remove elements of British colonisation and foreign influence from the country's institutions.

The Cabinet was made up of the Sri Lanka Freedom Party, the Lanka Sama Samaja Party (LSSP) and the Communist Party of Sri Lanka in a coalition government as the United Front. Key members of the LSSP were given cabinet roles, including Leslie Goonewardene, N. M. Perera, Colvin R. de Silva and others. The LSSP was dismissed from the cabinet by Bandaranaike in September 1975, ending the United Front, and in February 1972 the Communist Party also left the government.

Cabinet members

Parliamentary secretaries and deputy ministers

References

1970 establishments in Ceylon
1977 disestablishments in Sri Lanka
Cabinets disestablished in 1977
Cabinets established in 1970
Cabinet of Sri Lanka
Ministries of Elizabeth II